The Great Key Island giant rat, or Great Key Island uromys (Uromys siebersi) is a species of rodent in the family Muridae. It is known only from Great Key Island, Indonesia. 

The species name is after the ornithologist H. C. Siebers.

References

Uromys
Mammals described in 1923
Taxa named by Oldfield Thomas